are random fortunes written on strips of paper at Shinto shrines and Buddhist temples in Japan. Literally "sacred lot", these are usually received by making a small offering and randomly choosing one from a box, hoping for the resulting fortune to be good. , coin-slot machines sometimes dispense .

The  predicts the person's chances of their hopes coming true, of finding a good match, or generally matters of health, fortune, life, etc. When the prediction is bad, it is a custom to fold up the strip of paper and attach it to a pine tree or a wall of metal wires alongside other bad fortunes in the temple or shrine grounds. In the event of the fortune being good, the bearer has two options: they can also tie it to the tree or wires so that the fortune has a greater effect or they can keep it for luck.  are available at many shrines and temples, and remain one of the traditional activities related to shrine or temple-going.

History

Historically, however, the Japanese  system is thought to have been modeled after the Chinese , a similar form of divination involving a tube full of bamboo sticks and a sequence of written or printed oracles. A wooden container containing oracular lots dated 1409 (Ōei 16) is preserved in Tendai-ji in Iwate Prefecture, suggesting that this method of fortune telling was imported to Japan somewhere before the Muromachi period (1336–1573).

The  became popular in the Edo period due to the notable monk Tenkai (1536–1643), who is credited with attaching Ryōgen's name to it. A story related by one of Tenkai's disciples claims that Tenkai was once visited in a dream by Ryōgen, who revealed to him the existence of the 100 quatrains, which had been supposedly lost for centuries. Copies of these short poems were eventually discovered at Togakushi Shrine in Shinano Province (modern Nagano Prefecture) and widely disseminated. The  eventually became standard across many Buddhist temples (even those not affiliated with the Tendai school) and served as a model for other  sequences. Various books explaining the meaning of the oracles were published during the period, suggesting their widespread popularity.

Fortunes

The standard  sequence contains the following fortunes (from best to worst):

 
 
 
 
 
 
 

It then lists fortunes regarding specific aspects of one's life, which may include any number of the following among other possible combinations:

  – auspicious/inauspicious directions (see feng shui)
  – one's wish or desire
  – a person being waited for
  – lost article(s)
  – travel
  – business dealings
  – studies or learning
  – market speculation
  – disputes
  – romantic relationships
  – moving or changing residence
  – childbirth, delivery 
  – illness
  – marriage proposal or engagement

Relation to fortune cookies

Gallery

See also

I Ching divination

Omamori
Onmyōdō
Poe divination

References

External links

Divination
Shinto in Japan
Shinto religious objects
Buddhism in Japan
Buddhism and Shinto
Japanese words and phrases